Richfield is a town in Wood County, Wisconsin, United States. The population was 1,523 at the 2000 census. The unincorporated community of Bethel is located within the town.

History
Richfield township was established in 1881.

Geography
According to the United States Census Bureau, the town has a total area of 34.8 square miles (90.2 km2), of which, 34.8 square miles (90.1 km2) of it is land and 0.04 square miles (0.1 km2) of it (0.11%) is water.

Demographics
As of the census of 2000, there were 1,523 people, 473 households, and 383 families residing in the town. The population density was 43.8 people per square mile (16.9/km2). There were 485 housing units at an average density of 13.9 per square mile (5.4/km2). The racial makeup of the town was 98.03% White, 0.13% African American, 0.13% Native American, 1.64% Asian, and 0.07% from two or more races.

There were 473 households, out of which 41.2% had children under the age of 18 living with them, 71.7% were married couples living together, 5.1% had a female householder with no husband present, and 19.0% were non-families. 14.0% of all households were made up of individuals, and 5.3% had someone living alone who was 65 years of age or older. The average household size was 2.98 and the average family size was 3.26.

In the town, the population was spread out, with 27.8% under the age of 18, 6.5% from 18 to 24, 29.1% from 25 to 44, 21.2% from 45 to 64, and 15.4% who were 65 years of age or older. The median age was 36 years. For every 100 females, there were 95.3 males. For every 100 females age 18 and over, there were 100.7 males.

The median income for a household in the town was $47,188, and the median income for a family was $51,765. Males had a median income of $30,338 versus $24,643 for females. The per capita income for the town was $18,775. About 4.5% of families and 8.5% of the population were below the poverty line, including 11.1% of those under age 18 and 4.6% of those age 65 or over.

Notable people

 Frank J. Shortner, Wisconsin businessman and legislator, was born in the town

References

External links 
 Plat maps:  1852 1879 1896 1909 1928 1956

Towns in Wood County, Wisconsin
Towns in Wisconsin